This is a list of the works of the architect Alfred C. Finn.

Chronological list

References

Bibliography
 
 
 
 

Architects from Texas
People from Houston
Buildings and structures in Texas